Leona Lishoy is an Indian actress and model who is known for her works primarily in Malayalam cinema. She is the daughter of Malayalam actor Lishoy.

Personal life

Leona is the daughter of Malayalam movie and television actor Lishoy. She did her schooling in Hari Sri Vidhya Nidhi School, Thrissur, Kerala. She is an alumnus of Christ University, Bangalore and went on to receive an MBA diploma from Symbiosis University, Bangalore.

Career
Leona started off as a model for various advertisements. She was subsequently signed on to play the role of Sharada's daughter in Kalikaalam. Her first substantial role was in Jawan of Vellimala, starring Mammootty, Mamtha Mohandas  in which she played Asif Ali's love interest in 2012.

In the 2013 she played the female lead in science fiction movie Red Rain, which had an international cast and crew.

She was also seen in cameo roles in North 24 Kaatham and Haram, both of which starred Fahadh Faasil in the lead. Leona essayed a serious role as Dr. Treesa,  the mother of Sara Arjun in Annmariya Kalippilannu in 2016.

Leona also signed on to play an orphan in a Yatheemkhana in Hadiya.

She expanded her repertoire with notable performances in Vishwasapoorvam Mansoor, Maradona, Queen and Athiran.

Her performance as Sameera, a movie actress in the movie Mayanadi was widely accepted. Leona played the role of Mariya in the thriller-drama Ishq, starring Ann Sheetal and Shane Nigam.

In Prasobh Vijayan's Anveshanam, Leona starred alongside Jayasuriya and Shruthi Ramachandran. She received widespread acclaim for her nuanced portrayal of a police officer.

Her upcoming releases are Jijo Joseph's Varayan, Djinn, directed by Siddharth Bharathan and starring Soubin Shahir and Ram, directed by Jeethu Joseph and starring Mohanlal, Trisha and Indrajith.

Filmography

Television

Short films

References

External links 
 

Living people
Indian film actresses
Actresses from Thrissur
Actresses in Malayalam cinema
Actresses in Kannada cinema
Actresses in Tamil cinema
Actresses in Telugu cinema
21st-century Indian actresses
1991 births
Christ University alumni
Hari Sri Vidya Nidhi School alumni